The 1958 Soviet Football Championship, Class B was the ninth season of the Soviet Class B football competitions since their establishment in 1950. It was also the eighteenth season of the Soviet second tier professional football competitions. 

It involved participation of 94 "teams of masters" split in six groups which were composed by regional principle to some extent. Compared with the previous season, the number of participants was increased by 30(!) teams and there were added two additional groups. The teams were distributed somewhat equally among the six groups with five groups containing 16 teams and one "Far East" group - 14.

Six group winners qualified for the single round-robin final tournament which was won by SKVO Rostov-na-Donu. The winner of the final tournament gained promotion to the next season Class A competitions.

Teams
Promoted to (33): Trudoviye Rezervy Lipetsk, Iskra Kazan, Dinamo Ulyanovsk, Energiya Volzhskiy, Znamya Truda Orekhovo-Zuyevo, Trudoviye Rezervy Kursk, Trud Glukhovo, Volga Kalinin, LTI Leningrad, SKVO Rostov-na-Donu, Shakhtyor Shakhty, Metallurg Stalingrad, Temp Makhachkala, Trud Astrakhan, Zvezda Perm, Metallurg Magnitogorsk, Khimik Berezniki, Metallurg Nizhniy Tagil, Lokomotiv Svobodny, Lokomotiv Ulan-Ude, SKVO Odessa, Spartak Kherson, Zvezda Kirovograd, Kolhospnik Cherkassy, Avangard Simferopol, Lokomotiv Vinnitsa, Kolhospnyk Rovno, Lokomotiv Stalino, Burevestnik Tbilisi, Shirak Leninakan, Trudoviye Rezervy Tashkent, Pamir Leninabad, Shakhtyor Karaganda

Relegated to (1): Spartak Minsk

First stage

Zone I

Number of teams by republics

Zone II

Number of teams by republics

Zone III

Number of teams by republics

Zone IV

Play-off for 1st place
 [in Tbilisi]
 SKVO Rostov-na-Donu  2-1 Spartak Yerevan

Number of teams by republics

Zone V

Number of teams by republics

Zone VI
 [All teams are from Russian Federation]

Final stage
 [Nov 5-22, Tbilisi]

See also
 1958 Soviet Class A
 1958 Soviet Cup

References

 1958 at rsssf.com

1958
2
Soviet
Soviet